The South Peace Centennial Museum is an open-air museum in west-central Alberta, Canada.  The museum's buildings include homesteaders' cabins, a trading post, church, school, grist mill, community hall, general store, blacksmith shop, barn, carriage house, and railway buildings.  The museum also features an extensive collection of antique tractors, steam engine, stationary engines, horse-drawn wagons, carriages and antique automobiles.

See also
List of museums in Alberta

References

External links
South Peace Centennial Museum

Open-air museums in Canada
Grain elevator museums in Alberta
Railway station museums in Alberta
Blacksmith shops